Oviedo Club Baloncesto, also known as Alimerka Oviedo Baloncesto for sponsorship reasons, is a professional basketball team based in Oviedo, Asturias, that plays in the Spanish LEB Oro league.

History

First years

Oviedo CB was founded in 2004 to substitute old CB Vetusta, today dissolved. In their first season, 2004–05, the club started playing at Liga EBA, but was relegated to Primera División after winning only six games of 30. The club returned to Liga EBA the next season, after achieving a 27–0 record.

At the 2006–07 season, was champion of the Group A of Liga EBA, but was eliminated in the Round of 16 of the promotion playoffs to LEB Plata by Ciudad Torrealta Molina. At the next season, Oviedo finished again as champion of the group A and promoted to the new league created: LEB Bronce.

In their first season in a professional league (2008–09), Oviedo finished in the 14th position and avoided the relegation to Liga EBA, but after the elimination of the LEB Bronce, the club board decided not to promote to LEB Plata and continue playing at EBA due to insufficient funds to compete in a higher division.

2009–10 was a new season at Liga EBA for Oviedo CB and clinched the third title of the Group A. At this time, finally the club promoted to LEB Plata after beating in the promotion playoffs Atarfe, CB Vic and Real Canoe NC. After this season, the club was considered the best one of the Liga EBA with only two defeats at the regular season and a 3–3 balance in the playoffs.

Playing in LEB Plata
After promoting, the club needed to search money to play the 2010–2011 LEB Plata season, and finally did it. FEVE Oviedo qualified for the promotion playoffs after finishing in the eight position of the regular season. Promobys Tíjola defeated Oviedo in the quarterfinals by 3–1.

On February 1, 2013, the team played the Copa LEB Plata, but was defeated 71–78 by CEBA Guadalajara. After this loss, the team continued brilliantly the season and promoted to LEB Oro after being claimed as champion of the 2012–13 LEB Plata with a win at Gran Canaria B by 59–89 on March 9, 2013.

2013–present: growing in LEB Oro
After the brilliant promotion to LEB Oro, Oviedo CB started playing in the second division of Spanish basketball. The team was the main surprise of league and consolidated in the first positions of the league table, thanks to a great performance at Pumarín, where it remained unbeaten during 15 months, until Ford Burgos won at Pumarín by 17 points.

In its first season in LEB Oro, Unión Financiera Oviedo Baloncesto (its sponsorship naming) qualified for the promotion playoffs to Liga ACB and defeated Leyma Natura Básquet Coruña in the quarterfinals by 2–0. Finally, OCB was eliminated by Quesos Cerrato Palencia in the semifinals by 1–3.

On 20 December 2016, Oviedo CB headed the league table of the LEB Oro for the first time in its history, after beating away Araberri by 86–75. Just ten days later, the club qualified for the first time to the Copa Princesa de Asturias, by finishing in the top of the table after the first half of the 2016–17 league. Oviedo conquered the Cup on 27 January 2017, after beating San Pablo Inmobiliaria Burgos in the final by 80–77.

Sponsorship naming
Oviedo CB has received diverse sponsorship names along the years:
Domo Residencial Oviedo: 2004–2005, 2006–2008
Basemat OCB: 2005–2006
FEVE Oviedo Baloncesto: 2008–2011
Unión Financiera Asturiana Oviedo Baloncesto: 2012–2013
Unión Financiera Baloncesto Oviedo: 2013–2018
Liberbank Oviedo Baloncesto: 2018–present

Players

Current roster

Depth chart

Head coaches
Miguel Moreno 2004
Emilio García 2004–2005
Iván Martín 2005–2008
Mariano Arasa 2008–2009
Alfredo Riera 2009–2012
Guillermo Arenas 2012–2015
Carles Marco 2015–2018
Javi Rodríguez 2018–2020
Natxo Lezkano 2020–present

Season by season

Trophies and awards

Trophies
Copa Princesa de Asturias: (1)
2017
LEB Plata: (1)
2013
Liga EBA: (1)
2010

Individual awards
All LEB Oro Team
Fran Cárdenas – 2014

Copa Princesa de Asturias MVP
Miquel Salvó – 2017

LEB Plata MVP
Ian O'Leary – 2011
Will Hanley – 2013

Individual records
Top performers of Oviedo CB, as of the end of the 2018–19 season. Not including games of the 2005–06 season, when Oviedo CB played in Primera División.

Most capped players

Top scorers

References

External links
Official website 
Profile at Asturcesto 

Basketball teams in Asturias
Sport in Oviedo
LEB Plata teams
Basketball teams established in 2004